María Candelaria Francés García (2 February 1887– 9 December 1987), better known as María Francés, was a Spanish stage, film and television actress.

Selected filmography
 Anguish (1947)
 The Vila Family (1950)
 The Black Crown (1951)
 Furrows (1951)
 Persecution in Madrid (1952)
 The Song of Sister Maria (1952)
 Lovers of Toledo (1953)
 Such is Madrid (1953)
 Flight 971 (1953)
 Pride (1955)
 The Violet Seller (1958)
 Plácido (1961)
 Another's Wife (1967)

References

Bibliography 
 D'Lugo, Marvin. Guide to the Cinema of Spain. Greenwood Publishing, 1997.

External links 
 

1887 births
1987 deaths
Spanish film actresses
Spanish television actresses